The 2016 Minor Counties Championship was the 112th Minor Counties Cricket Championship season, and the third under the name 'Unicorn Counties Championship'. It was contested in two divisions. Berkshire defeated Lincolnshire by 28 runs in the final, which was played at the Getty Estate, Buckinghamshire.

Standings

Format
Teams receive 16 points for a win, 8 for a tie and 4 for a draw. In a match reduced to a single innings, teams receive 12 points for a win, 8 for a draw and 4 points for losing. For matches abandoned without play, both sides receive 8 points. Bonus points (a maximum of 4 batting points and 4 bowling points) may be scored during the first 90 overs of each team's first innings.

Eastern Division

Western Division

Final
The final featured the teams which finished with the most points in each Division, Berkshire and Lincolnshire. It began on 28 August 2016 at the Getty Estate with the result being a victory for Berkshire by 28 runs. Berkshire had last won the title in 2008 whilst Lincolnshire's most recent victory was in 2003.

References

2016 in English cricket
2016